Nauman Shabbir (15 December 1953 – 22 October 2013) was a Pakistani cricketer. He played first-class cricket for several domestic teams in Pakistan including Habib Bank Limited, Lahore and Punjab between 1971 and 1989.

References

External links
 

1953 births
2013 deaths
Pakistani cricketers
Habib Bank Limited cricketers
Lahore cricketers
Punjab (Pakistan) cricketers
Cricketers from Lahore